Lathyrus lanszwertii is a species of sweet pea known by the common names Nevada sweet pea or peavine. It is found in western North America from California to Texas to British Columbia. It is a tender vining perennial which bears lavender, fuchsia, or white pea flowers, and pods containing inedible peas. There is much variation among individuals of this species, and there are several distinct varieties:

Lathyrus lanszwertii var. aridus - Nevada pea
Lathyrus lanszwertii var. brownii - Brown's pea
Lathyrus lanszwertii var. lanszwertii - Lanszwert's pea
Lathyrus lanszwertii var. leucanthus - Nevada pea
Lathyrus lanszwertii var. tracyi - Tracy's pea

References

External links
Calflora Database:   (Nevada pea)
USDA Plants Profile
Jepson Manual Treatment

lanszwertii
Flora of the Western United States
Flora of California
Flora of the Sierra Nevada (United States)
Plants described in 1863
Flora without expected TNC conservation status